The AFL Women's All-Australian team is an all-star team of women's Australian rules footballers playing in the AFL Women's (AFLW), selected by a panel at the end of each season. It represents a complete team, including interchange players and a coach, of the best-performed players during the home-and-away season. The first AFL Women's All-Australian team was selected in 2017 following the competition's inaugural season. The team also follows the AFL's tradition of the All-Australian coach being the coach of that season's premiership-winning side, with no coach being selected in 2020 when no premiership was awarded.

Despite its nature, the AFL Women's All-Australian team is only ceremonial: the AFL Women's has not played any all-star matches as of season seven, and the difference in skill level between the All-Australian team and the nearest international competitor is currently too large for any contest to be competitive. 

Like in the Australian Football League (AFL) with their All-Australian team since 1991 (following the Victorian Football League's conversion to a national competition), the panel chooses a complete AFLW team consisting of sixteen players and five interchange players (as opposed to eighteen players and four interchange players in the AFL), based on performances during the home-and-away season.

The inaugural team was the only team to contain 22 players, as match-day teams in the AFLW were reduced to 21 players from 2018. The AFL Women's All-Australian team was sponsored by Virgin Australia in the competition's first three seasons and by Toyota in 2020.

Teams

2017

2018

2019

2020

2021

2022

Season seven

Most selections
The following players have achieved selection in at least three AFL Women's All-Australian teams.

See also

All-Australian team

References

External links
 AFLW Awards

    
   
National Australian rules football teams
Lists of AFL Women's players